"High Hopes" is a song by Dublin-based alternative rock quartet Kodaline. The song was released as a digital download on 15 March 2013, as the lead single from their debut studio album In a Perfect World (2013). The song reached number one on the Irish Singles Chart, their second overall number one single in Ireland after "Give Me a Minute" in 2007 as 21 Demands. It was featured in a trailer for the film Love, Rosie.

Music video
A music video to accompany the release of "High Hopes" was first released onto YouTube on 23 January 2013 at a total length of four minutes and ten seconds and stars Irish actors Liam Cunningham and Niamh Large.

The video starts off with a man in his car ready to gas himself to death. As he sits inside his car, a woman with a wedding dress runs down a hill being chased by a man she has presumably just left at the altar. As the abandoned groom man watches from afar, the suicidal man removes the hose from his exhaust pipe and helps the woman escape in his car. After the successful escape, the depressed man drives the bride to his house. They become closer and eventually fall in love. While out for a walk, the man she presumably left at the altar appears suddenly and shoots them both. The man crawls bleeding toward his lover and grasps her hand while the screen fades to black. The man wakes up in hospital, and it appears he is the only one who has survived the shooting. But as he sits looking forlornly out the hospital window, his love appears and embraces him from behind.

Track listing

Chart performance
On 21 March 2013 the song entered the Irish Singles Chart at number 1. On 24 March 2013 the song entered the UK Singles Chart at number 16, their first top 20 UK single. The song has also peaked to number 13 on the Scottish Singles Chart.

Weekly charts

Year-end charts

Certifications

Release history

References

2013 singles
Kodaline songs
Irish Singles Chart number-one singles
2013 songs